Maghery Country Park is a park in the village of Maghery, County Armagh, Northern Ireland, on the shores of Lough Neagh. Coney Island lies one km off shore and boat trips are available from the park at weekends. It is an important local amenity and tourist attraction and is managed by Armagh City, Banbridge and Craigavon Borough Council.

References

Parks in County Armagh
Forests and woodlands of Northern Ireland
Country parks in Northern Ireland